Arestoceras is an extinct genus of cephalopod belonging to the Ammonite subclass.

References

Cretaceous ammonites
Albian life
Albian genus extinctions